Happy End is the third and final album by Japanese folk rock band Happy End. It was recorded in Los Angeles, produced by Van Dyke Parks and features several American session musicians such as Lowell George and Bill Payne of the band Little Feat.

Background and recording
The album was recorded at Sunset Sound Studios in Los Angeles in late 1972. Van Dyke Parks, known for his collaborations with Brian Wilson and The Beach Boys, produced the album. In 2013, Parks stated that the band walked in unannounced while he and Lowell George were working on "Sailin' Shoes" and asked him to give them the "California Sound". He initially refused saying he was busy with sessions for his own album Discover America, but accepted when George noticed a suitcase full of new one hundred-dollar bills with Happy End's manager.

Although Haruomi Hosono later described the work with Parks as "productive," the album sessions were tenuous, and the members of Happy End were disenchanted with their vision of America they had anticipated. A language barrier along with opposition between the Los Angeles studio personnel and the band was also apparent, which further frustrated the group. He and Eiichi Ohtaki both recalled that Parks was drunk during production and tried to lecture them about Pearl Harbor and World War II. These feelings were conveyed in the closing track , which received some contributions from Parks and George. As Takashi Matsumoto explained: "We had already given up on Japan, and with [that song], we were saying bye-bye to America too—we weren't going to belong to any place."

Happy End officially disbanded on December 31, 1972, two months before the album was released on February 25, 1973.

In 1974, Shigeru Suzuki returned to Los Angeles to record his first solo album Band Wagon and once again worked with Bill Payne, Dick Hyde and Kirby Johnson.

The song "Fuuraibo" would be covered by pop singer Chisato Moritaka on her 1998 album, This Summer Will Be More Better, which was produced by Hosono.

Track listing

Personnel

Happy End
Haruomi Hosono - bass guitar, mandolin, acoustic guitar, piano, vocals
Eiichi Ohtaki - acoustic guitar, vocals
Shigeru Suzuki - electric guitar, acoustic guitar
Takashi Matsumoto - drums, percussion

Session musicians and production staff
Kirby Johnson - brass arrangements on tracks 1-3
Van Dyke Parks - organ, piano
Tom Scott - alto sax, tenor sax
Bill Payne - piano
Dave Duke - French horn
Slyde Hyde - trombone
Chuck Findley - trumpet
Lowell George - slide guitar
Design and layout by Work Shop Mu!!
Photo by Masahiro Nogami

References 
Footnotes

Citations

Happy End (band) albums
Japanese-language albums
1973 albums
Albums produced by Van Dyke Parks